Morton Township is located in Tazewell County, Illinois, at T25N R3W.  It is traversed by Interstate Routes 74 and 155, about 15 km (10 mi) southeast of Peoria, Illinois.

As of the 2010 census, its population was 17,036 and it contained 7,246 housing units.

Geography

Demographics

References

External links
City-data.com
Illinois State Archives

Townships in Tazewell County, Illinois
Peoria metropolitan area, Illinois
Townships in Illinois
1849 establishments in Illinois
Populated places established in 1849